The pagan Slavs were polytheistic, which means that they worshipped many gods and goddesses. The gods of the Slavs are known primarily from a small number of chronicles and letopises, or not very accurate Christian sermons against paganism. Additional, more numerous sources in which Slavic theonyms are preserved include names, proper names, place names, folk holidays, and language, including sayings.

Information about Slavic paganism, including the gods, is scarce because Christian missionaries were not very interested in the spiritual life of the Slavs. Also, no accounts written down directly by the pagan Slavs exist. During the Christianization missions, the deities, on the one hand, were demonized to deter from worshipping them, on the other hand, their characteristics and functions were assumed by the saints, which was supposed to make the new religion less alien.

Common Slavic deities 
Because of the small number of sources, there is no consensus among scholars of Slavic mythology on the extent of the worship of even the most important deities. Listed in this paragraph are those whose Panslavic range is most often recognized. In addition to these, the East Slavic Mokosh (a presumed toponym in the Czech Republic), and the East Slavic Stribog (toponyms in Poland) are sometimes indicated.

Supreme deities 
Based on the reconstructed myths around the figures of Perun and Veles, some scholars believe that both of these gods are chief deities. They are primarily found in the Slavic creation myth. According to some scholars, a pair of these gods prove "Slavic dualism", but there is no consensus on this either, and those who assume that such dualism in mythology may have existed, point out that Slavic dualism was probably not as extreme as in Christianity or Zoroastrianism.

Other deities

Personifications

West Slavic deities

East and South Slavic deities

Deities listed anonymously 

There are two sources that mention a nameless Slavic chief god. Procopius of Caesarea in the Gothic Wars describes the religion of the South Slavs:

Similar information, however, concerning the West Slavic Polabians, appears in Helmold's Chronicle:

It is unclear how reliably these accounts describe Slavic theology. Some scholars believe that these texts are Christian interpretations of the faith of the pagan Slavs; Helmold, writing about the god of gods, clearly borrowed the term (deus deorum) from the Book of psalms (50:1). In the case of Procopius' text, for example, Aleksander Brückner argued that the text was a calque, an image with a Hellenized tinge imposed on Slavic paganism. Scholars who accept at least partial authenticity of these messages believe that they may convey information about henotheism, the Slavic deus otiosus – a passive god who does not interfere directly in world affairs and whose commands are carried out by other gods. It is also possible that they may refer to the replacement of the passive sky god by a more active thunder god, just as the Greek Uranus was replaced by Zeus. Although Procopius and Helmold do not mention the names of these gods, whose names they probably did not know because of taboos, it is generally believed that Perun, or Svarog, was involved here.

Cosmas of Prague describes Czech paganism in his Chronica Boemorum through the Interpretatio Romana: "Therefore, sacrifice to your gods an ass so that they become your succour. Those who wish you to make this offering are Jupiter, most important of the gods, Mars himself, his sister Bellona and the son-in law of Ceres (i.e. Pluto).

In the Chronicle, Thietmar describes the Christianization of Pomerania. In 1000, during the congress of Gniezno, Reinbern was appointed bishop of Kołobrzeg. Thietmar further wrote that Reinbern "destroyed the temples of the idols, he burnt them, and, after anointing four stone idols of their demons with holy chrism, he threw them into the lake and then blessed the water to cleanse it". Perhaps the passage in this message is about the sea god.

Deities of uncertain status 

 Chernobog and Belobog – alleged deities of bad fortune and good fortune.
 Diva – theonym mentioned by Sermon by Saint Gregory.
 Diy – theonym mentioned in Sermon and Revelation by the Holy Apostles. Possibly related to sky or rain.
 Hennil or Bendil – an agricultural deity mentioned by Thietmar.
 Yarilo – East Slavic ritual and ritual figure attested since the 18th century Interpreted as a deity of vegetation.
 Karna and Zhelya – assumed personifications of weeping for the dead among the East Slavs, appear in The Tale of Igor's Campaign.
 Korab, a deity found in old Croatian mythology, associated with the sea, navigation and fishing, that was reportedly the eponym of the island of Rab, the mountain of Korab and a kind of a boat.
 Kresnik – character in Slovenian folklore. Together with his brother, Trot, he flew in a golden chariot. He fought the Zhmij or Dragon in sky or on earth, who stole his cattle or abducted his wife. Identified with Perun.
 Kruh – a Polabian god. Perhaps related to Khors.
 Lel and Polel – alleged Polish divine twins first mentioned by Maciej Miechowita as counterparts of Castor and Pollux. 
 *Ljutobog – hypothetical name of a Polabian deity. Reinhold Trautmann, on the basis of the Polabian village of Lutebuk, probably located on the island of Usedom, first attested in 1238, and which burned down in the 17th century, proposed the existence of a "harsh god" (luty "harsh") as opposed to the "white god". 
 Nyja – Alleged Polish deity of death, compared to Pluto. 
 Ognyena Maria – figure in East and South Slavic folklore. Sister of St. Elijah (Perun), associated with lightning and an arrow, her feast day was 17 July. 
 Pereplut – theonym mentioned in Sermon by the Holy Father Saint John Chrysostom. 
 Perperuna and Dodola – pagan folk festival celebrated in the Balkans that was used to bring rain. Some scholars suggest that the name of the festival originally may have been the name of a goddess, the wife of Perun.
 Pizamar – deity mentioned in the Knýtlinga saga. The exact reading of the name is unclear, which has led some scholars to suggest that the author understood the ordinary name as a theonym.
 Pogoda – alleged Polish weather goddess mentioned by Jan Długosz.
 Trot – character in Slovenian folklore. Together with his brother, Kresnik, he flew in a golden chariot. In one story, he decapitated Zhmij with a golden axe. 
 Zele – deity mentioned as worshipped by pagan Czechs mentioned by abbot Jan Neplach.
 Żywie – goddess mentioned by Jan Długosz.

Pseudo-deities

See also
 Outline of Slavic history and culture
 List of Slavic studies journals

References

Bibliography

Further reading
 Rosik, Stanisław. The Slavic Religion in the Light of 11th- and 12th-Century German Chronicles (Thietmar of Merseburg, Adam of Bremen, Helmold of Bosau). Leiden, The Netherlands: Brill, 2020. doi: https://doi.org/10.1163/9789004331488

Slavic deities
Slavic
Slavic mythology
Slavic neopaganism